Helen Gilbert (1922 – 8 April 2002), also known as Helen Gilbert-Bushnell, Helen Odell Gilbert and Helen Odell, was an American artist and art-educator born in Mare Island, California. She earned a baccalaureate in art at Mills College, in California. After graduation, she moved to Honolulu, where she married Honolulu physician Fred Gilbert. In 1968, she received an MFA degree from the University of Hawaii at Manoa, and then remained on the faculty for 30 years. Her second marriage was to fellow artist Kenneth Wayne Bushnell in 1995. She had also been a visiting professor at Parsons The New School for Design and the Pratt Institute. She died at home of cancer on April 8, 2002.

Although she painted images of the land and people of Hawaii with brush and palette knife, her fame rests upon her pioneering use of polarized light in kinetic sculpture. Licomos, a kinetic sculpture from 1970, in the collection of the Honolulu Museum of Art is an example. The colors change as they move around in a circle behind stationary Plexiglass. The Bibliothèque nationale de France, the British Museum, the Honolulu Museum of Art, the Georgia Museum of Art, the Metropolitan Museum of Art, the Museum of Modern Art (New York), the Solomon R. Guggenheim Museum (New York), Stedelijk Museum Amsterdam, the Tate Gallery (London), Tokyo National Museum, the Walker Art Center (Minneapolis), and the Whitney Museum of American Art (New York) are among the public collections holding works by Helen Gilbert.

References
 Wisnosky, John and Tom Klobe, A Tradition of Excellence, University of Hawai'i, Honolulu, 2002, pp. 56–59
 Yoshihara, Lisa A., Collective Visions, Hawaii State Foundation on Culture and the Arts, Honolulu, 1997, p. 41.

Footnotes

1922 births
2002 deaths
Artists from Hawaii
Kinetic sculptors
American women sculptors
Mills College alumni
University of Hawaiʻi at Mānoa alumni
20th-century American sculptors
20th-century American women artists
University of Hawaiʻi faculty
Sculptors from California
Artists from Vallejo, California
American women academics